Ceva railway station is the railway station serving the comune of Ceva, in the Piedmont region, northwestern Italy. It is the junction of the Turin–Savona and Ceva–Ormea railways.

The station is currently managed by Rete Ferroviaria Italiana (RFI). Train services are operated by Trenitalia.  Each of these companies is a subsidiary of Ferrovie dello Stato (FS), Italy's state-owned rail company.

History
The station was opened on 28 September 1874, upon the inauguration of the track from Ceva to Savona of the Turin–Savona railway.

The line Bra–Ceva closed in 1994. Passenger services on the line to Ormea suspended from 17 June 2012 and reopened from 11 September 2016 as a tourist railway.

Train services
The station is served by the following service(s):

Express services (Regionale veloce) Turin - Fossano - San Giuseppe di Cairo - Savona
Regional services (Treno regionale) Fossano - San Giuseppe di Cairo
Historic train (Treno storico) Turin - Ceva - Ormea

References

External links

Railway stations in Piedmont
Ceva